This is a discography by the indie British rock band The Charlatans.

Albums

Studio albums

Compilation albums

Live albums

Singles

Videos
 Just Lookin' 1990–1997 (20 May 2002)
 Live at Last (11 April 2005)
 Forever: The Singles (13 November 2006)

References

Discography
Discographies of British artists
Rock music group discographies